Not Just a Girl (The Highlights) is a compilation album by Shania Twain. It was first released digitally on July 26, 2022, before receiving a physical CD release on September 2, 2022. The digital release coincides with the Netflix documentary spanning Twain's music career, Not Just a Girl. The album contains one new track, the title track, and 17 previously released singles from Twain's five studio albums. The title track was later included on her sixth studio album Queen of Me.

Track listing

Charts

Weekly charts

Year-end charts

Release history

References 

2022 compilation albums
Mercury Nashville albums
Shania Twain albums